The Black House is the third studio album by black metal band Krieg. Darkland Records released the vinyl version with a bonus track, "Coronation", and a poster limited to 500 blue copies.

Track listing

Personnel
Imperial – vocals
Phaedrus – guitar
SM Daemon – bass
Thron – drums
Aazaron – additional vocals
L Hiver – additional vocals

2004 albums
Krieg (band) albums